A mammary alveolus (plural: alveoli, from Latin alveolus, "little cavity") is a small cavity or sac found in the mammary gland. Mammary alveoli are the site of milk production and storage in the mammary gland. Mammary alveoli cluster into groups called mammary lobules, and each breast may contain 15 to 20 of these lobules. The lobules drain milk through the lactiferous ducts out of the nipples.

See also
 Lactation
 Breastfeeding

References

Breast anatomy